United Nations Security Council Resolution 147, adopted unanimously on August 23, 1960, after examining the application of the Republic of Dahomey (now known as Benin) for membership in the United Nations, the Council recommended to the General Assembly that the Republic of Dahomey be admitted.

See also
List of United Nations Security Council Resolutions 101 to 200 (1953–1965)

References
Text of the Resolution at undocs.org

External links
 

 0147
 0147
 0147
1960 in the Republic of Dahomey